Tim Rieder (born 3 September 1993) is a German professional footballer who plays as a defensive midfielder for  club 1860 Munich.

Career
In August 2020, Rieder joined 1. FC Kaiserslautern on a three-year contract.

On 8 July 2021, Rieder signed with 3. Liga club Türkgücü München. He made his competitive debut for the club on 25 August in the season opener against SC Verl which ended in a 0–0 draw. He made a total of 31 appearances for the club in which he failed to score.

Rieder returned to his former club 1860 Munich on 16 May 2022, after Türkgücü München had filed for insolvency. On 23 July, he made his return debut for the club on the opening day of the 2022–23 season, also scoring his first goal for the club in a 4–3 away victory against Dynamo Dresden. He then played the entire match in a 3–0 loss to Borussia Dortmund in the first round of the DFB-Pokal.

Career statistics

References

External links
 

1993 births
Living people
People from Dachau
Sportspeople from Upper Bavaria
Footballers from Bavaria
German footballers
German expatriate footballers
German expatriate sportspeople in Poland
Expatriate footballers in Poland
Association football defenders
FC Augsburg II players
FC Augsburg players
Śląsk Wrocław players
SV Darmstadt 98 players
TSV 1860 Munich players
1. FC Kaiserslautern players
Türkgücü München players
Bundesliga players
2. Bundesliga players
3. Liga players
Regionalliga players
Ekstraklasa players